Michael Owens (February 6, 1837 – December 8, 1890) was a United States Marine who received the Medal of Honor for actions during the Korean Expedition of 1871.

Owens enlisted in the Marine Corps from New York City in August 1865, and was medically discharged in 1888.

Medal of Honor citation

Rank and organization: Private, U.S. Marine Corps. Born: February 6, 1853, New York, N.Y. Accredited to: New York. G.O. No.: 169, February 8, 1872.

Citation:

On board the U.S.S. Colorado during the capture of Korean forts, 11 June 1871. Fighting courageously in hand-to-hand combat, Owens was badly wounded by the enemy during this action.

See also
List of Medal of Honor recipients

Notes

References

External links

1837 births
1890 deaths
Burials at Mount Moriah Cemetery (Philadelphia)
United States Marine Corps Medal of Honor recipients
United States Marines
Military personnel from New York City
Korean Expedition (1871) recipients of the Medal of Honor